The 2nd constituency of Allier is a French legislative constituency in the Allier département.

Members elected

Election results

2022

 
 
 
 
 
 
|-
| colspan="8" bgcolor="#E9E9E9"|
|-
 
 

 
 
 
 
* Pozzoli ran as a dissident member of PS, without the support of the NUPES alliance.

** Triki ran as a dissident member of Horizons, without the support of the Ensemble Citoyens alliance.

2017

2012

|- style="background-color:#E9E9E9;text-align:center;"
! colspan="2" rowspan="2" style="text-align:left;" | Candidate
! rowspan="2" colspan="2" style="text-align:left;" | Party
! colspan="2" | 1st round
! colspan="2" | 2nd round
|- style="background-color:#E9E9E9;text-align:center;"
! width="75" | Votes
! width="30" | %
! width="75" | Votes
! width="30" | %
|-
| style="background-color:" |
| style="text-align:left;" | Bernard Lesterlin
| style="text-align:left;" | Socialist Party
| PS
| 
| 36.51%
| 
| 59.24%
|-
| style="background-color:" |
| style="text-align:left;" | Daniel Duglery
| style="text-align:left;" | Union for a Popular Movement
| UMP
| 
| 30.99%
| 
| 40.76%
|-
| style="background-color:" |
| style="text-align:left;" | Luc Bourduge
| style="text-align:left;" | Left Front
| FG
| 
| 16.18%
| colspan="2" style="text-align:left;" | 
|-
| style="background-color:" |
| style="text-align:left;" | Pascal Courty
| style="text-align:left;" | National Front
| FN
| 
| 10.05%
| colspan="2" style="text-align:left;" | 
|-
| style="background-color:" |
| style="text-align:left;" | Marie Couval
| style="text-align:left;" | Europe Ecology – The Greens
| EELV
| 
| 2.07%
| colspan="2" style="text-align:left;" | 
|-
| style="background-color:" |
| style="text-align:left;" | Bernard Taillandier
| style="text-align:left;" | Miscellaneous Right
| DVD
| 
| 1.57%
| colspan="2" style="text-align:left;" | 
|-
| style="background-color:" |
| style="text-align:left;" | Jean-Marie Guillaumin
| style="text-align:left;" | Europe Ecology – The Greens
| EELV
| 
| 0.98%
| colspan="2" style="text-align:left;" | 
|-
| style="background-color:" |
| style="text-align:left;" | René Casilla
| style="text-align:left;" | Far Left
| ExG
| 
| 0.76%
| colspan="2" style="text-align:left;" | 
|-
| style="background-color:" |
| style="text-align:left;" | Véronique Dreyfus
| style="text-align:left;" | Far Left
| ExG
| 
| 0.65%
| colspan="2" style="text-align:left;" | 
|-
| style="background-color:" |
| style="text-align:left;" | Jean-Paul Moret
| style="text-align:left;" | Far Left
| ExG
| 
| 0.23%
| colspan="2" style="text-align:left;" | 
|-
| colspan="8" style="background-color:#E9E9E9;"|
|- style="font-weight:bold"
| colspan="4" style="text-align:left;" | Total
| 
| 100%
| 
| 100%
|-
| colspan="8" style="background-color:#E9E9E9;"|
|-
| colspan="4" style="text-align:left;" | Registered voters
| 
| style="background-color:#E9E9E9;"|
| 
| style="background-color:#E9E9E9;"|
|-
| colspan="4" style="text-align:left;" | Blank/Void ballots
| 
| 1.24%
| 
| 2.38%
|-
| colspan="4" style="text-align:left;" | Turnout
| 
| 60.69%
| 
| 61.68%
|-
| colspan="4" style="text-align:left;" | Abstentions
| 
| 39.31%
| 
| 38.32%
|-
| colspan="8" style="background-color:#E9E9E9;"|
|- style="font-weight:bold"
| colspan="6" style="text-align:left;" | Result
| colspan="2" style="background-color:" | PS hold
|}

2007

|- style="background-color:#E9E9E9;text-align:center;"
! colspan="2" rowspan="2" style="text-align:left;" | Candidate
! rowspan="2" colspan="2" style="text-align:left;" | Party
! colspan="2" | 1st round
! colspan="2" | 2nd round
|- style="background-color:#E9E9E9;text-align:center;"
! width="75" | Votes
! width="30" | %
! width="75" | Votes
! width="30" | %
|-
| style="background-color:" |
| style="text-align:left;" | Bernard Lesterlin
| style="text-align:left;" | Socialist Party
| PS
| 
| 25.46%
| 
| 53.59%
|-
| style="background-color:" |
| style="text-align:left;" | Daniel Duglery
| style="text-align:left;" | Union for a Popular Movement
| UMP
| 
| 40.91%
| 
| 46.41%
|-
| style="background-color:" |
| style="text-align:left;" | Mireille Schurch
| style="text-align:left;" | Communist
| COM
| 
| 19.66%
| colspan="2" style="text-align:left;" |
|-
| style="background-color:" |
| style="text-align:left;" | Pierre-Antoine Legoutiere
| style="text-align:left;" | Democratic Movement
| MoDem
| 
| 4.26%
| colspan="2" style="text-align:left;" |
|-
| style="background-color:" |
| style="text-align:left;" | Agnés Falcon
| style="text-align:left;" | National Front
| FN
| 
| 2.34%
| colspan="2" style="text-align:left;" |
|-
| style="background-color:" |
| style="text-align:left;" | Claudy Aubert-Dasse
| style="text-align:left;" | The Greens
| VEC
| 
| 1.43%
| colspan="2" style="text-align:left;" |
|-
| style="background-color:" |
| style="text-align:left;" | Christian Nguyen
| style="text-align:left;" | Far Left
| EXG
| 
| 1.25%
| colspan="2" style="text-align:left;" |
|-
| style="background-color:" |
| style="text-align:left;" | Michel Albert
| style="text-align:left;" | Hunting, Fishing, Nature, Traditions
| CPNT
| 
| 0.89%
| colspan="2" style="text-align:left;" |
|-
| style="background-color:" |
| style="text-align:left;" | Véronique Dreyfus
| style="text-align:left;" | Far Left
| EXG
| 
| 0.84%
| colspan="2" style="text-align:left;" |
|-
| style="background-color:" |
| style="text-align:left;" | Michel Raynaud
| style="text-align:left;" | Far Left
| EXG
| 
| 0.79%
| colspan="2" style="text-align:left;" |
|-
| style="background-color:" |
| style="text-align:left;" | Marie-Thérèse Nicod
| style="text-align:left;" | Movement for France
| MPF
| 
| 0.75%
| colspan="2" style="text-align:left;" |
|-
| style="background-color:" |
| style="text-align:left;" | Monique Cornet
| style="text-align:left;" | Ecologist
| ECO
| 
| 0.75%
| colspan="2" style="text-align:left;" |
|-
| style="background-color:" |
| style="text-align:left;" | Jean-Paul Moret
| style="text-align:left;" | Far Left
| EXG
| 
| 0.34%
| colspan="2" style="text-align:left;" |
|-
| style="background-color:" |
| style="text-align:left;" | Vensa Lazarevic
| style="text-align:left;" | Divers
| DIV
| 
| 0.33%
| colspan="2" style="text-align:left;" |
|-
| style="background-color:" |
| style="text-align:left;" | Georges Vitti
| style="text-align:left;" | Divers
| DIV
| 
| 0.00%
| colspan="2" style="text-align:left;" |
|-
| colspan="8" style="background-color:#E9E9E9;"|
|- style="font-weight:bold"
| colspan="4" style="text-align:left;" | Total
| 
| 100%
| 
| 100%
|-
| colspan="8" style="background-color:#E9E9E9;"|
|-
| colspan="4" style="text-align:left;" | Registered voters
| 
| style="background-color:#E9E9E9;"|
| 
| style="background-color:#E9E9E9;"|
|-
| colspan="4" style="text-align:left;" | Blank/Void ballots
| 
| 2.26%
| 
| 2.70%
|-
| colspan="4" style="text-align:left;" | Turnout
| 
| 63.45%
| 
| 67.28%
|-
| colspan="4" style="text-align:left;" | Abstentions
| 
| 36.55%
| 
| 32.72%
|-
| colspan="8" style="background-color:#E9E9E9;"|
|- style="font-weight:bold"
| colspan="6" style="text-align:left;" | Result
| colspan="2" style="background-color:" | PS GAIN
|}

2002

 
 
 
 
 
 
|-
| colspan="8" bgcolor="#E9E9E9"|
|-

1997

References

Sources
 Official results of French elections from 1998: 

2